The men's light heavyweight event was part of the boxing programme at the 1972 Summer Olympics. The weight class allowed boxers of up to 81 kilograms to compete. The competition was held from 28 August to 10 September 1972. 28 boxers from 28 nations competed.

Medalists

Results

The following boxers took part in the event:

First round
 Isaac Ikhouria (NGR) def. Anton Schaer (SUI), 3:2
 Valdemar Paulino Oliveira (BRA) def. Nghivav Mehtab Singh (IND), 5:0
 Nikolay Anfimov (URS) def. Georgi Stankov (BUL), 5:0
 Mahmoud Ahmed Ali (EGY) def. Gombo Zorig (MGL), 5:0
 Janusz Gortat (POL) def. Jaroslav Kral (TCH), 5:0
 Raymond Russell (USA) def. Stephen Thega (KEN), TKO-2
 Rudi Hornig (FRG) def. Henri Moreau (FRA), 5:0
 Guglielmo Spinello (ITA) def. Samson Laizer (TNZ), KO-2
 Marian Culineac (ROU) def. Oliver Wright (JAM), 5:0
 Miguel Angel Cuello (ARG) def. Ottomar Sachse (GDR), 4:1
 Mate Parlov (YUG) def. Noureddine Aman Hassan (CHA), TKO-2
 Imre Tóth (HUN) def. Matthias Ouma (UGA), 3:2

Second round
 Gilberto Carrillo (CUB) def. Ernesto Sanchez (VEN), KO-1
 Harald Skog (NOR) def. Seifu Mekkonen (ETH), 5:0
 Isaac Ikhouria (NGR) def. Valdemar Paulino Oliveira (BRA), 5:0
 Nikolay Anfimov (URS) def. Mahmoud Ahmed Ali (EGY), TKO-3
 Janusz Gortat (POL) def. Raymond Russell (USA), 3:2
 Rudi Hornig (FRG) def. Guglielmo Spinello (ITA), 4:1
 Miguel Angel Cuello (ARG) def. Marian Culineac (ROU), TKO-2
 Mate Parlov (YUG) def. Imre Tóth (HUN), TKO-2

Quarterfinals
 Gilberto Carrillo (CUB) def. Harald Skog (NOR), TKO-1
 Isaac Ikhouria (NGR) def. Nikolay Anfimov (URS), 3:2
 Janusz Gortat (POL) def. Rudi Hornig (FRG), TKO-1
 Mate Parlov (YUG) def. Miguel Angel Cuello (ARG), walk-over

Semifinals
 Gilberto Carrillo (CUB) def. Isaac Ikhouria (NGR), 5:0
 Mate Parlov (YUG) def. Janusz Gortat (POL), 5:0

Final
 Mate Parlov (YUG) def. Gilberto Carrillo (CUB), TKO-2

References

Light Heavyweight